Scharnitz is a municipality in the district of Innsbruck-Land in the Austrian state of Tyrol located  north of Innsbruck and  from  Seefeld in Tirol on the German border. It is one of the largest municipalities and has 10 parts: Au, Eisack, Gießenbach, Inrain, Jägerviertel, Oberdorf, Schanz, Schießstand, Siedlung, Unterdorf. The village was founded in the early Middle Ages and was once an important commercial route between Germany and Italy. The main source of income is tourism, both in summer and winter. Scharnitz is the western entry point to the Hinterau valley, where the source of river Isar is located.

Population

References

External links

Cities and towns in Innsbruck-Land District